Sir David Anderson (6 July 1880–27 March 1953) was a Scottish civil engineer and lawyer.

Anderson was born in 1880 at Leven, Fife, Scotland. In 1921, on his return from Army service, Anderson joined a partnership with fellow engineers Basil Mott and David Hay, forming the company Mott Hay and Anderson. Mott, Hay and Anderson traded until 1989, when it merged with Sir M MacDonald & Partners to form Mott MacDonald.

Anderson was elected president of the Institution of Civil Engineers for the November 1943 to November 1944 session. He was created a Knight Bachelor in 1951.

References 

        
        
        
        
        
        

Scottish civil engineers
Scottish lawyers
People educated at the High School of Dundee
Presidents of the Institution of Civil Engineers
Presidents of the Smeatonian Society of Civil Engineers
1880 births
1953 deaths
People from Leven, Fife
20th-century Scottish businesspeople